Earl Warren Throckmorton (born 1957) is a professor of psychology  at Grove City College in Grove City, Pennsylvania. He developed the Sexual Identity Therapy Framework and was a creator of the documentary I Do Exist, about people who say they have changed their sexual orientation. He is an example of an evangelical Christian who has changed his view about human sexuality, from traditional to more progressive.

Education 
Throckmorton received his B.A. in psychology in  1979 from Cedarville College, an M.A. in clinical psychology from Central Michigan University in 1982, and a Ph.D. in counselor education and community counseling from Ohio University in 1992.

Sexual identity and the Bible 
Throckmorton's work on Sexual Identity Therapy was endorsed by psychiatrist Robert L. Spitzer. The purpose of these recommendations is to help patients make their sexual identity conform to their beliefs and values.

Throckmorton has been involved in controversy over the origins and treatment of variations in gender identity. The February 2008 issue of Christianity Today carried an article discussing how Throckmorton has advised people who are in agony over being transgender that their desires are not in accord with the Bible. "Even if science does determine differentiation in the brain at birth," Throckmorton says, "even if there are prenatal influences, we can't set aside teachings of the Bible, because of research findings." Throckmorton subsequently argued that these comments were quoted "out of context". On his blog, he stated that people should consult physicians, specialists, and spiritual advisors in resolving their feelings. If someone decides that sexual reassignment violates faith, then this feeling may guide their decisions.

Journalist Jeff Sharlet said that Throckmorton has allowed data and evidence to shape his views "in a way very few people of any ideological or political stripe would." That article goes on to trace Throckmorton's on-going development of his views on human sexuality and the Bible, which he still believes is divinely inspired. To say it more clearly, Throckmorton has blogged: "After working with LGBT people for two decades, I believe some people are inherently gay."

Books 
 
 , a rebuttal to The Jefferson Lies by David Barton

References

External links
Throckmorton's blog
Dr. E. Warren Throckmorton faculty page

1957 births
Living people
American University alumni
Ohio University alumni
Central Michigan University alumni
Sexual orientation change efforts
Cedarville University alumni
Grove City College
People from Portsmouth, Ohio
Christian bloggers